Murexsul metivieri is a species of sea snail, a marine gastropod mollusk in the family Muricidae, the murex snails or rock snails.

Description

Distribution
This marine species occurs in the Coral Sea.

References

 Houart, R., 1988 Description of seven new species of Muricidae (Neagastropoda) from the south-western Pacific Ocean- Venus, vol. 47(3), pp. 185–196

External links
 MNHN, Paris: Murexsul metivieri (holotype)

Muricidae
Gastropods described in 1988